Eugen Balint (born 5 March 1927) was a Romanian gymnast. He competed in eight events at the 1952 Summer Olympics.

References

External links
 

1927 births
Possibly living people
Romanian male artistic gymnasts
Olympic gymnasts of Romania
Gymnasts at the 1952 Summer Olympics
Place of birth missing